Victor Elissalt (born 23 November 1991) is a French professional footballer who plays as a midfielder for Championnat National 2 club Bergerac.

Career
Elissalt made his professional debut with Béziers in a 1–1 (6–5) shootout loss in the Coupe de la Ligue to Orléans on 14 August 2018.

In November 2018, Elissalt joined Le Mans of the Championnat National on loan until the end of the season.

References

External links
 
 Foot National Profile
 

1991 births
Living people
People from Mont-de-Marsan
Sportspeople from Landes (department)
Association football midfielders
French footballers
Stade Montois (football) players
FC Martigues players
Aviron Bayonnais FC players
AS Béziers (2007) players
Le Mans FC players
Bergerac Périgord FC players
Ligue 2 players
Championnat National players
Championnat National 2 players
Championnat National 3 players
Footballers from Nouvelle-Aquitaine